It Might Be You is a Philippine primetime drama series produced and aired by ABS-CBN from December 8, 2003 to December 10, 2004. The series revolves around Lawrence (John Lloyd Cruz) and Cielo (Bea Alonzo), who've known each other since they were little and fell in love. This series was written by Ricky Lee and directed by Don Cuaresma and Gilbert Perez. John Lloyd and Bea were the second team pairing of the series after Kay Tagal Kang Hinintay.

Premise
In the small town of Montegracia, politics are in disarray, but amidst the stifling competition for power, a special friendship blossoms between the mayor's son, Lawrence Trinidad and an impoverished orphan, Cielo San Carlos.

Although they come from wildly different social backgrounds, their friendship grows into an unlikely romance; Lawrence and Cielo realize that love is not all roses and moonlight, especially when they discover harrowing realities about their families and a dark past. Throughout their complex lives, Lawrence and Cielo hold fast to their love.

Cast and characters

Protagonists
John Lloyd Cruz as Earl Lawrence M. Trinidad
Bea Alonzo as Cielo San Carlos / Cielo Lacuesta

Main cast
John Prats as Gian Carlo Pablo / Gian Carlo Lacuesta
Maja Salvador as Cara Victorino
Tirso Cruz III as Ernesto Lord Trinidad
Maritoni Fernandez as Frida Montegracia-Trinidad
Jean Garcia as Orlanda Mae "Ola" Lacuesta
Gardo Versoza as Camilo San Carlos
Sarsi Emmanuelle as Guadalupe "Lupe" San Carlos
Bodjie Pascua as Eseng San Carlos
Lani Mercado as Farrah / Nena
Baron Geisler as Derek Castro

Recurring cast
Kathryn Bernardo as young Cielo
King Alcala as young Lawrence
Isabel Oli as Aretha
Marco Alcaraz as Axel
Pia Wurtzbach as Allison / Mary Lou
Mico Palanca as Romer
Susan Africa as Margaret
Toby Alejar
Gio Alvarez as Ebony
Lui Villaruz as Ivory
Nanding Josef as Johnny Pablo
Sarita Perez de Tagle as Britney
Bianca Lapus as Eloise
Lynn Sherman as Lolita
Vanna Garcia
Katherine Luna
Dick Israel as Bruno
Isay Alvarez as Sister Flor
Beth Tamayo as Sister Hannah

See also
 List of programs aired by ABS-CBN
 List of ABS-CBN drama series

References

External links
 

ABS-CBN drama series
2003 Philippine television series debuts
2004 Philippine television series endings
Television series by Star Creatives
Filipino-language television shows
Television shows set in Metro Manila